The Kidarites, or Kidara Huns, were a dynasty that ruled Bactria and adjoining parts of Central Asia and South Asia in the 4th and 5th centuries. The Kidarites belonged to a complex of peoples known collectively in India as the Huna, and in Europe as the Chionites (from the Iranian names Xwn/Xyon), and may even be considered as identical to the Chionites. The 5th century Byzantine historian Priscus called them Kidarite Huns, or "Huns who are Kidarites". The Huna/Xionite tribes are often linked, albeit controversially, to the Huns who invaded Eastern Europe during a similar period. They are entirely different from the Hephthalites, who replaced them about a century later.

The Kidarites were named after Kidara (Chinese: 寄多羅 Jiduoluo, ancient pronunciation: Kjie-ta-la) one of their main rulers. The Kidarites appear to have been a part of a Huna horde known in Latin sources as the "Kermichiones" (from the Iranian Karmir Xyon) or "Red Huna". The Kidarites established the first of four major Xionite/Huna states in Central Asia, followed by the Alchon, the Hephthalites and the Nezak.

In 360–370 CE, a Kidarite kingdom was established in Central Asian regions previously ruled by the Sasanian Empire, replacing the Kushano-Sasanians in Bactria. Thereafter, the Sasanian Empire roughly stopped at Merv. Next, circa 390-410 CE, the Kidarites invaded northwestern India, where they replaced the remnants of the Kushan Empire in the area of Punjab.

Origins

A nomadic people, the Kidarites appear to have originated in the Altai Mountains region. Some scholars believe that the Kidarites were "Europid" in appearance, with some East Asian (i.e. Mongoloid) admixture. On Kidarite coins their rulers are depicted as beardless or clean-shaven – a feature of Inner Asian cultures at the time (as opposed, for example, to the Iranian cultures of South Central Asia at the time). They may have been Oghuric speakers originally, as may have been the Chionites and the Hephthalites, before adopting the Bactrian language. The Kidarites were depicted as mounted archers on the reverse of coins. They were also known to practice artificial cranial deformation.

The Kidarites appear to have been synonymous with the Karmir Xyon ("Red Xionites" or, more controversially, "Red Huns"), – a major subdivision of the Chionites (Xionites), alongside the Spet Xyon ("White Xionites"). In a recently discovered seal with the image of a ruler similar to those of the Kidarite coins, the ruler named himself in Bactrian "King of the Huns and Great Kushan Shah" (uonano shao o(a)zarko (k)oshanoshao). The discovery was reportedly made in Swat.

The name of their eponymous ruler Kidara (fl. 350–385) may be cognate with the Turkic word Kidirti meaning "west", suggesting that the Kidarites were originally the westernmost of the Xionites, and the first to migrate from Inner Asia. Chinese sources suggest that when the Uar (滑 Huá) were driven westward by the Later Zhao state, circa 320, from the area around Pingyang (平陽; modern Linfen, Shanxi), it put pressure on Xionite-affiliated peoples, such as the Kidarites, to migrate. Another theory is that climate change in the Altai during the 4th century caused various tribes to migrate westward and southward.

Contemporary Chinese and Roman sources suggest that, during the 4th century, the Kidarites  began to encroach on the territory of Greater Khorasan and the Kushan Empire – migrating through Transoxiana into Bactria, where they were initially vassals of the Kushans and adopted many elements of Kushano-Bactrian culture. The Kidarites also initially  put pressure on the Sasanian Empire, but later served as mercenaries in the Sassanian army, under which they fought the Romans in Mesopotamia, led by a chief named Grumbates (fl. 353–358 CE).  Some of the Kidarites apparently became a ruling dynasty of the Kushan Empire, leading to the epithet "Little Kushans".

Kidarite kingdom

First appearance in literary sources

The first evidence are gold coins discovered in Balkh dating from the mid-4th century. The Kushano-Sasanian ruler Varahran during the second phase of his reign, had to introduce the Kidarite tamga in his coinage minted at Balkh in Bactria, circa 340-345. The tamgha replaced the nandipada symbol which had been in use since Vasudeva I, suggesting that the Kidarites had now taken control, first under their ruler Kirada. Then ram horns were added to the effigy of Varahran on his coinage for a brief period under the Kidarite ruler Peroz, and raised ribbons were added around the crown ball under the Kidarite ruler Kidara. In effect, Varahran has been described as a "puppet" of the Kidarites. By 365, the Kidarite ruler Kidara I was placing his name on the coinage of the region, and assumed the title of Kushanshah. In Gandhara too, the Kidarites minted silver coins in the name of Varahran, until Kidara also introduced his own name there.

Archaeological, numismatic, and sigillographic evidence demonstrates the Kidarites ruled a realm just as refined as that of the Sasanians. They swiftly adopted Iranian imperial symbolism and titulature, as demonstrated by a seal; "Lord Ularg, the king of the Huns, the great Kushan-shah, the Samarkandian, of the Afrigan (?) family."

Most other data we currently have on the Kidarite kingdom are from Chinese and Byzantine sources from the middle of the 5th century. The Kidarites were the first Huna to bother India. Indian records note that the Hūna had established themselves in modern Afghanistan and the North-West Frontier Province by the first half of the 5th century, and the Gupta emperor Skandagupta had repelled a Hūna invasion in 455. The Kidarites are the last dynasty to regard themselves (on the legend of their coins) as the inheritors of the Kushan empire, which had disappeared as an independent entity two centuries earlier.

Migration into Bactria
 

Around 350, the Sasanian Emperor Shapur II (ruled 309 to 379) had to interrupt his conflict with the Romans, and abandon the siege of Nisibis, in order to face nomadic threats in the east: he was attacked in the east by Scythian Massagetae and other Central Asian tribes. Around this time, Xionite/Huna tribes, most likely the Kidarites, whose king was Grumbates, make an appearance as an encroaching threat upon Sasanian territory as well as a menace to the Gupta Empire (320–500).

After a prolonged struggle (353–358) they were forced to conclude an alliance, and their king Grumbates accompanied Shapur II in the war against the Romans, agreeing to enlist his light cavalrymen into the Persian army and accompanying Shapur II. The presence of "Grumbates, king of the Chionitae" and his Xionites with Shapur II during campaigns in the Western Caspian lands, in the area of Corduene, is described by the contemporary eyewitness Ammianus Marcellinus:

The presence of Grumbates alongside Shapur II is also recorded at the successful Siege of Amida in 359, in which Grumbates lost his son:

Later the alliance fell apart, and by the time of Bahram IV (388–399) the Sasanians had lost numerous battles against the Kidarites. The migrating Kidarites then settled in Bactria, where they replaced the Kushano-Sasanids, a branch of the Sasanids that had displaced the weakening Kushans in the area two centuries before. It is thought that they were in firm possession of the region of Bactria by 360. Since this area corresponds roughly to Kushanshahr, the former western territories of the Kushans, Kidarite ruler Kidara called himself "Kidara King of the Kushans" on his coins.

According to Priscus, the Sasanian Empire was forced to pay tribute to the Kidarites, until the rule of Yazdgird II (ruled 438–457), who refused payment.

The Kidarites based their capital in Samarkand, where they were at the center of Central Asian trade networks, in close relation with the Sogdians. The Kidarites had a powerful administration and raised taxes, rather efficiently managing their territories, in contrast to the image of barbarians bent on destruction given by Persian accounts.

Fortresses

Kafir-kala is an ancient fortress 12 kilometers south of the city center of Samarkand in Uzbekistan, protecting the southern border of the Samarkand oasis. It consists in a central citadel built in mud-bricks and measuring 75 × 75 meters at its base has six towers and is surrounded by a moat, still visible today. Living quarters were located outside the citadel. The citadel was first occupied by the Kidarites in the 4th-5th century, whose coinage and bullae have been found.

Expansion to northwest India

The Kidarites consolidated their power in Northern Afghanistan before conquering Peshawar and parts of northwest India including Gandhara probably sometime between 390 and 410, around the end of the rule of Gupta Emperor Chandragupta II or beginning of the rule of Kumaragupta I. It is probably the rise of the Hephthalites and the defeats against the Sasanians which pushed the Kidarites into northern India.

Economy
The Kidarites issued gold coins on the model of Kushan coinage, inscribing their own names but still claiming the Kushan heritage by using the title "Kushan". The volume of Kidarite gold coinage was nevertheless much smaller than that of the Great Kushans, probably owing to a decline of commerce and the loss of major international trade routes.

Coins with the title or name Gadahara seem to be the first coins issued by the invading Kidarites in the Kushan realm in India. The additional presence of the names of foreign rulers such as the Kushano-Sassanian Piroz or the Gupta Empire Samudragupta on the coins may suggest some kind of suzerainty at a time when the remnants of Kushan power were torn between these two powers. The "Gadahara" issues seem to come chronologically just before the issues of the famous Kidarite ruler Kidara.

Religion

It seems Buddhism was rather unaffected by Kidarite rule, as the religion continued to prosper. The Chinese pilgrim Fa-hsien visited the region circa 400 CE, and described a wealthy Buddhist culture. Some aspects of the Buddhist art of Gandhara seem to have incorporated Zoroastrian elements conveyed by the Kidarites at that time, such as the depiction of fire altars on the bases of numerous Buddhist sculptures.

It has been argued that the spread of Indian culture and religions as far as Sogdia corresponded to the rule of the Kidarites over the regions from Sogdia to Gandhara.

Some Buddhist works of art, in a style marking some evolution compared to the art of Gandhara, have been suggested as belonging to the Kidarite period, such as the sculptures of Paitava.

Conflicts with the Gupta Empire

The Kidarites may have confronted the Gupta Empire during the rule of Kumaragupta I (414–c. 455) as the latter recounts some conflicts, although very vaguely, in his Mandsaur inscription. The Bhitari pillar inscription of Skandagupta, inscribed by his son Skandagupta (c. 455 – c. 467), recalls much more dramatically the near-annihilation of the Gupta Empire, and recovery though military victories against the attacks of the Pushyamitras and the Hunas. The Kidarites are the only Hunas who could have attacked India at the time, as the Hephthalites were still trying to set foot in Bactria in the middle of the 5th century. In the Bhitari inscription, Skandagupta clearly mentions conflagrations with the Hunas, even though some portions of the inscription have disappeared:

Even after these encounters, the Kidarites seem to have retained the western part of the Gupta Empire, particularly central and western Punjab, until they were displaced by the invasion of the Alchon Huns at the end of the 5th century. While they still ruled in Gandhara, the Kidarites are known to have sent an embassy to China in 477.

The Huna invasion are said to have seriously damaged Indo-Roman trade relations, which the Gupta Empire had greatly benefited from. The Guptas had been exporting numerous luxury products such as silk, leather goods, fur, iron products, ivory, pearl or pepper from centers such as Nasik, Paithan, Pataliputra or Benares etc. The Huna invasion probably disrupted these trade relations and the tax revenues that came with it. These conflicts exhausted the Gupta Empire: the gold coinage of Skandagupta is much fewer and of a lesser quality than that of his predecessors.

The Kidarites were cut from their Bactrian nomadic roots by the rise of the Hephthalites in the 450s. The Kidarites also seem to have been defeated by the Sasanian emperor Peroz in 467 CE, with Peroz reconquering Balkh and issuing coinage there as "Peroz King of Kings".

Conflict with Sasanian emperor Peroz I and the Hephthalites

Since the foundation of the Sasanian Empire, its rulers had demonstrated the sovereignty and power of their realm through collection of tribute, particularly from the Romans. However, the Sasanian efforts were disrupted in the early 5th-century by the Kidarites, who forced Yazdegerd I, Bahram V, and/or Yazdegerd II to pay them tribute. Although this did not trouble the Sasanian treasury, it was nevertheless humiliating. Yazdegerd II eventually refused to pay tribute, which would later be used as the casus belli of the Kidarites, who declared war against the ruling Sasanian king Peroz I in  464. Peroz lacked manpower to fight, and therefore asked for financial aid by the Byzantine Empire, who declined his request. He then offered peace to the king of the Kidarites, Kunkhas, and offered him his sister in marriage, but sent a woman of low status instead. After some time Kunkhas found about Peroz's false promise, and then in turn tried to trick him, by requesting him to send military experts to strengthen his army.

When a group of 300 military experts arrived to the court of Kunkhas at Balaam (possibly Balkh), they were either killed or disfigured and sent back to Iran, with the information that Kunkhas did this due to Peroz's false promise. Around this time, Peroz allied himself with the Hephthalites or the Alchon Huns of Mehama, the ruler of Kadag in eastern Bactria. With their help, he finally vanquished Kidarites in 466, and brought Bactria briefly under Sasanian control, where he issued gold coins of himself at Balkh. The style of the gold coin was largely based on the Kidarite coins, and displayed Peroz wearing his second crown. The following year (467), a Sasanian embassy arrived to the Byzantine capital of Constantinople, where the victory over the Kidarites was announced. The Sasanian embassy sent to the Northern Wei in 468 may have likewise done the same.

Although the Kidarites still controlled some places such as Gandhara and Punjab, they would never be an issue for the Sasanians again. But in India itself, the Kidarites may also have been losing territory to the Gupta Empire, following the 455 victories of Skandagupta. This created a power vacuum, which the Alchon Huns were able to fill, allowing them to reclaim the lost territories of the Kidarites.

Continental synchronism of Hunnic wars
There is an astounding synchronism between, on the one hand, the conflicts between the Kidarite Huns and the Sasanian Empire and the Gupta Empire, and, on the other hand, the campaigns of the Huns under Attila in Europe, leading to their defeat at the Catalaunian Plains in 451. It is almost as if the imperialist empire in the east and west had combined their response to a simultaneous Hunnic threat across Eurasia. In the end, Europe succeeded in repelling the Huns, and their power there quickly vanished, but in the east, both the Sasanian Empire and the Gupta Empire were left much weakened.

A few gold coins of the Kidarites were also found as far as Hungary and Poland in Europe, as a result of Asiatic migrations.

Kidarite successors

Many small Kidarite kingdoms seem to have survived in northwest India, and are known through their coinage. They were particularly present in Jammu and Kashmir, such as king Vinayaditya, but their coinage was much debased. They were then conquered by the Alchon Huns, sometimes considered as a branch of the Hephthalites, during the last quarter of the 5th century. The Alchon Huns followed the Kidarites into India circa 500, invading Indian territory as far as Eran and Kausambi.

The numismatic evidence as well as the so-called "Hephthalite bowl" from Gandhara, now in the British Museum, suggests a period of peaceful coexistence between the Kidarites and the Alchons, as it features two Kidarite noble hunters wearing their characteristic crowns, together with two Alchon hunters and one of the Alchons inside a medallion. At one point, the Kidarites withdrew from Gandhara, and the Alchons took over their mints from the time of Khingila. By 520, Gandhara was definitely under Hephthalite (Alchon Huns) control, according to Chinese pilgrims.

Anania Shirakatsi states in his Ashkharatsuyts, written in 7th century, that one of the Bulgar tribes, known as the Kidar were part of the Kidarites. The Kidar took part in Bulgar migrations across the Volga into Europe.

Ushrushana

Remnants of the Kidarites in Eastern Sogdiana may have been associated with the Principality of Ushrusana. The Kidarites may have survived and possibly established a Kidarite kingdom in Usrushana. This connection may be apparent from the analysis of the coinage, and in the names of some Ushrusana rulers such as Khaydhar ibn Kawus al-Afshin, whose personal name is attested as "Khydhar", and was sometimes written wrongly as "Haydar" in Arabic. In effect, the name "Kydr" was quite popular in Usrushana, and is attested in many contemporary sources. The title Afshin used by the rulers of Usrushana is also attested in the Kidarite ruler of Samarkand of the 5th century named Ularg, who bore the similar title "Afshiyan" (Bactrian script: αφϸιιανο).

Main Kidarite rulers

See also 

 
 
 Uar (tribe)
 "Iranian Huns"

References and notes

Sources
  
 
  
  
 
 
 
 
 
 
 
 
 ENOKI, K., « On the Date of the Kidarites (I) », Memoirs of the Research Department of the Toyo Bunko, 27, 1969, p. 1–26.
 GRENET, F. « Regional Interaction in Central Asia and North-West India in the Kidarite and Hephtalite Period », in SIMS-WILLIAMS, N. (ed.), Indo-Iranian Languages and Peoples, (Proceedings of the British Academy), London, 2002, p. 203–224.

Further reading
 
 

Empires and kingdoms of Pakistan
Empires and kingdoms of India
Bactria
Dynasties of Afghanistan
Nomadic groups in Eurasia
Historical Iranian peoples
Iranian nomads
Huns
Ancient history of Afghanistan
320 establishments
Former monarchies of Asia